Servillano Aquino y Aguilar (April 20, 1874 – February 3, 1959) was a Filipino general during the Philippine Revolution and the Philippine–American War. He served as a delegate to the Malolos Congress and was the grandfather of Benigno S. "Ninoy" Aquino Jr. He is the great-grandfather of Benigno Aquino III, the 15th President of the Philippines.

Early life and education
Aquino, known by his nickname "Mianong", was born on April 20, 1874, to Don Braulio Aquino y Lacsamana and Doña Petrona Aguilar y Henson. He had his early education from a private tutor in Mexico, Pampanga. He moved to Manila and entered the Colegio de San Juan de Letran, and later, the University of Santo Tomas.

Philippine–American War
In 1896, Aquino became a mason and joined the Katipunan. He was also elected mayor of Murcia, Tarlac and under General Francisco Macabulos, he organized the Filipino revolutionary forces against the Americans. He was promoted to major but was defeated in the battle at Mount Sinukuan or Mount Arayat in Arayat, Pampanga. After the Pact of Biak-na-Bato was signed, Aquino was self-exiled to Hong Kong together with Emilio Aguinaldo and the revolutionary government after receiving 100,000 pesos from the Spanish government in exchange of their surrender. He returned to the Philippines in 1898 and joined General Antonio Luna to fight against the American forces. Together they attacked Manila but retreated to Mount Arayat. In September 1902, he surrendered and was jailed in Bilibid Prison and sentenced to hang. However, United States President Theodore Roosevelt pardoned Aquino after two years.

Personal life
He married Guadalupe Quiambao, with whom he had three children, namely Gonzalo (born 1892), Benigno (1894–1947) and Amando (born 1896). Later, he married his sister-in-law, Belen Sanchez, and had a child with her, Herminio (born 1949).

Death
Aquino died of a heart attack on February 3, 1959.

Ancestry

See also
List of people pardoned or granted clemency by the president of the United States

References

. Accessed on April 24, 2007.
Allied Families: Aquino-Aguilar. Accessed on July 8, 2008.
Sugar and the Origins of Modern Philippine Society. Accessed on April 25, 2007.
Quirino, Carlos. Who's Who in Philippine History. Manila: Tahanan Books, 1995.  , .

1874 births
1959 deaths
Servillano Aquino
Filipino generals
Kapampangan people
People from Angeles City
People from Tarlac
Filipino Freemasons
People of the Philippine–American War
People of the Spanish–American War
Filipino prisoners sentenced to death
Prisoners sentenced to death by the United States military
Recipients of American presidential pardons
Mayors of places in Tarlac
Colegio de San Juan de Letran alumni
University of Santo Tomas alumni
Members of the Malolos Congress